Fresno County, officially the County of Fresno, is a county located in the central portion of the U.S. state of California. As of the 2020 Census, the population was 1,008,654. The county seat is Fresno, the fifth-most populous city in California.

Fresno County comprises the Fresno, CA Metropolitan Statistical Area, which is part of the Fresno-Madera, CA Combined Statistical Area. It is located in the Central Valley, south of Stockton and north of Bakersfield. Since 2010, statewide droughts in California have further strained both Fresno County's and the entire Central Valley's water security.

History
The area now known as Fresno County was the traditional homeland of Yokuts and Mono peoples, and was later settled by Spaniards during a search for suitable mission sites. In 1846, this area became part of the United States as a result of the Mexican War.

Fresno County was formed in 1856 from parts of Mariposa, Merced and Tulare counties. Fresno is Spanish for "ash tree" and it was in recognition of the abundance of the shrubby local Ash, Fraxinus dipetala, growing along the San Joaquin River that it received its name. Parts of Fresno County's territory were given to Mono County in 1861 and to Madera County in 1893. The original county seat was along the San Joaquin River in Millerton, but was moved to the rapidly growing town of Fresno on the newly built Southern Pacific Railroad line after a flood destroyed much of the town.

The settling of Fresno County was not without its conflicts, land disputes, and other natural disasters. Floods caused immeasurable damage elsewhere and fires also plagued the settlers of Fresno County. In 1882, the greatest of the early day fires wiped out an entire block of the city of Fresno, and was followed by another devastating blaze in 1883.

At the same time residents brought irrigation, electricity, and extensive agriculture to the area. In 1865, William Helm brought his sheep to Fresno county, which was then a vast space of open land. Helm was the largest individual sheep grower in Fresno County. Moses Church developed the first canals, called "Church Ditches," for irrigation. These canals allowed extensive cultivation of wheat. Francis Eisen, leader of the wine industry in Fresno County, also began the raisin industry in 1875, when he accidentally let some of his grapes dry on the vine. Anthony Easterby and Clovis Cole developed extensive grain and cattle ranches. These and other citizens laid the groundwork for the cultivation of Fresno County – now one of the nation's leading agricultural regions. In more recent times cotton became a major crop in Fresno and the southern San Joaquin Valley, but recent drought and lower demand have lessened cotton's importance to the local economy.

The discovery of oil in the western part of the county, near the town of Coalinga at the foot of the Coast Ranges, brought about an economic boom in the 1900s (decade), even though the field itself was known at least as early as the 1860s. By 1910, Coalinga Oil Field, the largest field in Fresno County, was the most richly productive oil field in California; a dramatic oil gusher in 1909, the biggest in California up until that time, was an event of sufficient excitement to cause the Los Angeles Stock Exchange to close for a day so that its members could come by train to view it.  The Coalinga field continues to produce oil, and is currently the eighth-largest field in the state.

Geography

Major watercourses are the San Joaquin River, Kings River, Delta-Mendota Canal, Big Creek, Friant Kern Canal, Helm Canal and Madera Canal. It is bordered on the west by the Coast Range and on the east by the Sierra Nevada. It is the center of a large agricultural area, known as the most agriculturally rich county in the United States. The county withdrew  of fresh water per day in 2000, more than any other county in the United States. In recent years, statewide droughts in California have further strained both Fresno's and the entire Central Valley's water security.

Fresno County is part of the Madera AVA wine region. However, Fresno was named after two particular ash trees that grew near the town of Minkler on the Kings River, one of which is still alive and standing.

National protected areas
 Giant Sequoia National Monument (part)
 Kings Canyon National Park (part)
 Sequoia National Forest (part)
 Sierra National Forest (part)

Geology
A number of minerals have been discovered in the county, including macdonaldite, krauskopfite, walstromite, fresnoite, verplanckite, muirite, traskite, and kampfite.

In October 2019, the Bureau of Land Management ended a five-year moratorium on leasing federal land in California to fossil fuel companies, opening 725,000 acres (1100 sq. miles; 29,000 ha) to drilling in San Benito, Monterey, and Fresno counties.

Demographics

2020 census

Note: the US Census treats Hispanic/Latino as an ethnic category. This table excludes Latinos from the racial categories and assigns them to a separate category. Hispanics/Latinos can be of any race.

2010 Census
 The racial makeup of Fresno County was 515,145 (55.4%) White, 49,523 (5.3%) African American, 15,649 (1.7%) Native American, 89,357 (9.6%) Asian (3.3% Hmong, 1.7% Asian Indian, 1.0% Filipino, 0.8% Laotian, 0.6% Chinese, 0.5% Japanese, 0.5% Cambodian, 0.3% Vietnamese, 0.2% Korean, 0.1% Pakistani, 0.1% Thai), 1,405 (0.2%) Pacific Islander, 217,085 (23.3%) from other races, and 42,286 (4.5%) from two or more races. Hispanic or Latino of any race were 468,070 persons (50.3%). 46.0% of Fresno County's population is of Mexican descent; 0.7% of its residents are Salvadoran, and 0.3% of its residents are Puerto Rican.

2000
As of the census of 2000, there were 799,407 people, 252,940 households, and 186,669 families residing in the county. The population density was 134 people per square mile (52/km2). There were 270,767 housing units at an average density of 45 per square mile (18/km2). The racial makeup of the county was 54.3% White, 5.3% Black or African American, 1.6% Native American, 8.1% Asian, 0.1% Pacific Islander, 25.9% from other races, and 4.7% from two or more races. 44.0% of the population were Hispanic or Latino of any race. In terms of ancestry, the county was 7.5% German, 6.6% Irish, 6.3% English ancestry according to Census 2000. 59.3% spoke English, 31.5% Spanish and 3.1% Hmong as their first language.

There were 252,940 households, out of which 41.2% had children under the age of 18 living with them, 52.5% were married couples living together, 15.2% had a female householder with no husband present, and 26.2% were non-families. 20.6% of all households were made up of individuals, and 7.8% had someone living alone who was 65 years of age or older. The average household size was 3.09 and the average family size was 3.59.

In the county, the population was spread out, with 32.1% under the age of 18, 11.1% from 18 to 24, 28.5% from 25 to 44, 18.5% from 45 to 64, and 9.9% who were 65 years of age or older. The median age was 30 years. For every 100 females there were 100.4 males. For every 100 females age 18 and over, there were 98.2 males.

The median income for a household in the county was $34,725, and the median income for a family was $38,455. Males had a median income of $33,375 versus $26,501 for females. The per capita income for the county was $15,495. About 17.6% of families and 22.9% of the population were below the poverty line, including 31.7% of those under age 18 and 9.9% of those age 65 or over.

Fresno County is also known for having the highest rate of chlamydia in the state. In 2006 it had 545.2 cases per 100,000 people, compared with the statewide average of 363.5.

Metropolitan Statistical Area
The United States Office of Management and Budget has designated Fresno County as the Fresno, CA Metropolitan Statistical Area.  The United States Census Bureau ranked the Fresno, CA Metropolitan Statistical Area as the 56th most populous metropolitan statistical area of the United States as of July 1, 2012.

The Office of Management and Budget has further designated the Fresno, CA Metropolitan Statistical Area as a component of the more extensive Fresno-Madera, CA Combined Statistical Area, the 49th most populous combined statistical area and the 55th most populous primary statistical area of the United States as of July 1, 2012.

Government and policing

Government

The Government of Fresno County is defined and authorized under the California Constitution, law, and the Charter of the County of Fresno. Much of the Government of California is in practice the responsibility of county governments, such as the Government of Fresno County. The County government provides countywide services such as elections and voter registration, law enforcement, jails, vital records, property records, tax collection, public health, and social services. In addition the County serves as the local government for all unincorporated areas.

The County government is composed of the elected five-member Board of Supervisors, several other elected offices including the Sheriff, District Attorney, Assessor-Recorder, Auditor-Controller/Treasurer-Tax Collector, and Clerk/Registrar of Voters, and numerous county departments and entities under the supervision of the County Administrator. As of February 2018 the members of the Fresno County Board of Supervisors are:

 Brian Pacheco, District 1
 Steve Brandau, District 2 
 Sal Quintero, District 3, 
 Buddy Mendes, District 4
 Nathan Magsig, District 5

Policing

County Sheriff
The Fresno County Sheriff provides court protection, jail administration, and coroner services for all of Fresno County and its population of approximately of 994,400 residents. They operate the Fresno County Jail in downtown Fresno. The department provides police patrol and detective services for the unincorporated areas of the county which encompasses approximately 250,000 residents, or 25% of the county's total population. The department also provides law enforcement services by contract with the city of San Joaquin, population 4100.

Municipal police
Municipal police departments in the county are: Fresno, population 500,000; Clovis, 110,000; Sanger,  25,000; Reedley, 24,000;
Selma, 23,000;  Coalinga, 17,000; Kerman, 14,000; Kingsburg, 12,000; Huron, 7,000;  Firebaugh, 8,500; Fowler, 6,500.

Politics

Overview 
Fresno County's voter registration shows a majority of Democratic voters.
Presidential elections have been competitive in recent decades. In 2020, Joe Biden became the first Democratic presidential candidate since Lyndon Johnson in 1964 to win a majority of the vote in Fresno County. 

The cities of Clovis, Coalinga, and Kingsburg voted overwhelmingly for Governor Mitt Romney. Reedley did so by much lesser margins and is now a GOP-leaning "swing" city in the county. Huron, Mendota, Orange Cove, Parlier, Fowler, Firebaugh, Fresno, Kerman, Sanger, Selma and San Joaquin voted overwhelmingly for President Barack Obama in 2008 and 2012.

According to the California Secretary of State, in October 2012 there were 410,188 registered voters in Fresno County. 158,267 (38.6%) were registered Republican, 164,663 (40.1%) were registered Democratic, 19,841 (4.8%) are registered with other political parties, and 67,417 (16.4%) declined to state a political party. Republicans have a plurality or majority of voter roll registration in the cities of Clovis, Coalinga, Kingsburg, Reedley, and the unincorporated areas. The other cities and towns have Democratic pluralities or majorities.

From Fresno County's incorporation in 1856, it voted Democratic in every election until the 1904 election in California, when President Theodore Roosevelt stood for re-election. Fresno County backed Roosevelt over his Democratic opponent Alton B. Parker. This did not immediately change the county's voting tendencies, however. It supported southern Democrat Woodrow Wilson in the elections of 1912 and 1916.

Fresno County was generally Republican from the onset of the "roaring 1920s" until the Great Depression, when former President Franklin D. Roosevelt forged the New Deal Coalition that benefitted the agrarian county. From 1932 till 1976 the county consistently voted Democratic, barring Richard Nixon's landslide victory over former Senator George McGovern (D-SD) in the 1972 Presidential Election.

With former President Jimmy Carter's defeat by former President Reagan, Fresno became a GOP-leaning swing county: it barely favored Reagan's successor former President Bush and voted Democratic for Bill Clinton only in his 1992 presidential bid. Republicans won elections in Fresno County by increasing margins from 1996 to 2004, but when the GOP lost ground with Hispanic voters after 2004, the county swung Democratic, voting twice for Barack Obama, and then for Hillary Clinton in 2016. Until the 2020 election, with Joe Biden winning nearly 53% of the vote, the last time the Democratic nominee won with an absolute majority of the vote was the 1964 election.

In the United States House of Representatives, Fresno County is split among four congressional districts:
 
 
 
 

In the California State Senate, the county is split among 3 legislative districts:
 ,
 , and
 .

Fresno tends to remain socially conservative while being more moderate on economic issues, which can be seen in Fresno's support for socially conservative proposition amendments but occasionally voting for a Democratic Presidential Candidate if economic times are poor such as former President Bill Clinton's victory over incumbent former President George H.W. Bush in 1992 and President Barack Obama over Senator John McCain in 2008.

As of 2022, elections for president lean Democratic. Statewide races have historically been competitive. Elections for governor are considered safe for Republicans. This is a somewhat unusual difference in voting patterns for a California county. For example, although Fresno County gave a majority of its votes to Joe Biden in the 2020 presidential election and has voted for the Democrat running for president ever since 2008, it voted “Yes” in the 2021 California gubernatorial recall election and has voted for the Republican candidate for governor in every election since 1978. 

On November 4, 2008, Fresno County voted 68.6% for Proposition 8, which amended the California Constitution to ban same-sex marriages.

Voter registration statistics

Cities by population and voter registration

Crime 

The following table includes the number of incidents reported and the rate per 1,000 persons for each type of offense.

Economy

Agriculture
Ag production totaled $7.98 billion in 2017, making it the number one agricultural county in the nation. Over 300 different crops are grown here. Major crops and livestocks include:

Grapes (see also Grape in California)
Cotton
Almonds
Tomatoes (see also Tomato in California)
Turkeys
Cattle
Milk
Plums (see also Plum in California)
Oranges
Peaches (see also Peach in California)
Nectarines (see also Nectarine in California)

The grape harvest brought in $1,046,356,645 in 2017. Production is chronically threatened by the presence of the Glassy-Winged Sharpshooter and the disease it carries, Pierce's Disease. See Glassy-Winged Sharpshooter in California and Pierce's Disease in California.

The peach harvest was worth $264,139,238 in 2017.

Fresno is the second highest cotton producer in the state, harvesting 223,443 bales in 2017. This is a close second to neighboring Kings.

Due to its tremendous agricultural success, the county also has a tremendous problem with glyphosate resistance. Okada et al., 2013 finds a high degree of resistance in Marestail (Conyza canadensis).

Companies based in Fresno County
Gottschalks Department Stores (liquidated in 2010 )
Sun-Maid Raisins
Pinnacle Armor, maker of the Dragon Skin Body Armor
Pelco, maker of surveillance cameras (acquired by Schneider Electric October 2007)
David Sunflower Seeds, now part of ConAgra Foods
Flicks Candy Company
Harris Ranch Beef Company
Saladino's Inc
National Raisin Company
Pacific Ethanol
United Security Bank
Central Valley Community Bank
Electronic Recyclers International

Major employers

Commercial/Industrial
Cargill
Zacky Farms
Kraft Foods
Foster Farms Dairy
Foster Farms
E & J Gallo Winery
Del Monte Foods
Pepsi Bottling Group
PPG Industries
Chevron
Pelco
Sun-Maid
Electronic Recyclers International
Saladino's Inc.
Grundfos
Amazon

Government
Internal Revenue Service
Caltrans
Mendota Federal Prison
Pleasant Valley State Prison
Coalinga State Hospital
144th Fighter Wing of the California Air National Guard

Healthcare
Children's Hospital Central California
Community Medical Center - Clovis
Coalinga Regional Medical Center
Fresno Surgery Center
Kaiser Foundation Hospital - Fresno
Kingsburg Medical Center
San Joaquin Valley Rehabilitation Hospital
Saint Agnes Medical Center
Sanger General Hospital
Selma Community Hospital
Sierra Kings Hospital - Reedley
University Medical Center - Fresno
VA Medical Center - Fresno

Nonprofits (community-based organizations)
Fresno Regional Foundation
Big Brothers Big Sisters
Central California Legal Services
Centro La Familia
Comprehensive Youth Services
Fresno Rescue Mission
Marjaree Mason Center, Inc.
Poverello House
United Way, Fresno County
Fresno Economic Opportunities Commission

Education

Tertiary education
Educational institutions in Fresno County include:

California State University, Fresno which opened in 1911.
California Health Sciences University is a private university established in 2012. It currently offers a College of Pharmacy and College of Osteopathic Medicine and is committed to health sciences research and improving the access and delivery of quality health care in the San Joaquin Valley.
San Joaquin College of Law is a private, nonprofit law school founded in 1969 and located in the City of Clovis.
Fresno Pacific University is a private university in the City of Fresno.

Within the California Community Colleges System, Fresno County is mostly covered by the State Center Community College District and the West Hills Community College District. The following campuses are in Fresno County:
 Clovis Community College near the City of Clovis
 Fresno City College in the City of Fresno
 Reedley College in the City of Reedley
 West Hills College Coalinga in the City of Coalinga

K-12 education
School districts include:

K-12:

 Caruthers Unified School District - Covers some areas for PK-12 and some for 9-12 only
 Central Unified School District
 Clovis Unified School District
 Coalinga-Huron Unified School District
 Cutler-Orosi Joint Unified School District
 Dos Palos-Oro Loma Joint Unified School District
 Firebaugh-Las Deltas Unified School District
 Fowler Unified School District
 Fresno Unified School District
 Golden Plains Unified School District
 Kerman Unified School District
 Kings Canyon Joint Unified School District
 Laton Joint Unified School District
 Mendota Unified School District
 Parlier Unified School District
 Riverdale Joint Unified School District - Covers some areas for PK-12 and some for 9-12 only
 Sanger Unified School District
 Selma Unified School District
 Sierra Unified School District - Covers some areas for PK-12 and some for 9-12 only
 Washington Unified School District - Covers some areas for PK-12 and some for 9-12 only

Secondary:
 Kingsburg Joint Union High School District
 Dinuba Unified School District (while it is a unified school district, in this county it only covers areas for grades 9-12)

Elementary:

 Alvina Elementary School District
 Big Creek Elementary School District
 Burrel Union Elementary School District
 Clay Joint Elementary School District
 Kingsburg Elementary Charter School District
 Monroe Elementary School District
 Monson-Sultana Joint Union Elementary School District
 Orange Center Elementary School District
 Pacific Union Elementary School District
 Pine Ridge Elementary School District
 Raisin City Elementary School District
 Washington Colony Elementary School District
 West Park Elementary School District
 Westside Elementary School District

Public libraries
In addition, the Fresno County Public Library operates public libraries throughout the county.

Transportation

Major highways 

 Interstate 5
 State Route 33
 State Route 41
 State Route 43
 State Route 63
 State Route 99
 State Route 145
 State Route 168
 State Route 180
 State Route 198
 State Route 201
 State Route 245
 State Route 269

Rail
BNSF Railway
Union Pacific Railroad
San Joaquin Valley Railroad
Biola Branch (Southern Pacific) (abandoned)
Shaver Lake Railroad (abandoned)
San Joaquin and Eastern Railroad (abandoned)

Airports 
Commercial service
Fresno Yosemite Int'l Airport

General Aviation
Fresno Chandler Executive Airport
Firebaugh Airport
Mendota Airport
New Coalinga Municipal Airport
Reedley Municipal Airport
Sierra Sky Park Airport

Public transportation
Fresno Area Express or FAX is the local bus operator in Fresno.
Clovis Transit Stageline is the bus service in Clovis.
Reedley Transit a.k.a. Dial-A-Ride services Reedley.
Fresno County Rural Transit Agency (FCRTA) offers a variety of local and intercity transit services around Fresno County.
Greyhound and Orange Belt Stages provide intercity, long-distance bus service.
Amtrak San Joaquins stop in Fresno.

Attractions

China Peak Ski Resort
Courtright Reservoir
Dinkey Lakes Wilderness
Fashion Fair Mall
Forestiere Underground Gardens
Fresno Art Museum
Fresno Chaffee Zoo
Fresno Fairgrounds
Fresno Metropolitan Museum (dissolved January 2010)
Fresno Water Tower

Hume Lake
Huntington Lake
Kings Canyon National Park
Lost Lake
Millerton Lake
Mount Darwin
North Palisade
Pine Flat Lake

River Park
Roeding Park
Shaver Lake
Sierra Vista Mall
Simonian Farms
William Saroyan Theatre
Save Mart Center
Wishon Reservoir
Woodward Park

Communities

Cities

Clovis
Coalinga
Firebaugh
Fowler
Fresno (county seat)
Huron
Kerman
Kingsburg
Mendota
Orange Cove
Parlier
Reedley
San Joaquin
Sanger
Selma

Census-designated places

Auberry
Big Creek
Biola
Bowles
Calwa
Cantua Creek
Caruthers
Centerville
Del Rey
Easton
Fort Washington
Friant
Lanare
Laton
Malaga
Mayfair
Millerton
Minkler
Monmouth
Old Fig Garden
Raisin City
Riverdale
Shaver Lake
Squaw Valley
Sunnyside
Tarpey Village
Three Rocks
Tranquillity
West Park
Westside

Unincorporated communities
Avocado
Burrel
Dunlap
Highway City
Hume
Mercey Hot Springs
Prather
Rolinda
Tollhouse

Population ranking

The population ranking of the following table is based on the 2010 census of Fresno County.

† county seat

See also

Fresno County Library
List of museums in the San Joaquin Valley
List of school districts in Fresno County, California
National Register of Historic Places listings in Fresno County, California

Notes

References

External links 

Fresno County Public Library
Fresno County Sequicentennial
Size of California Counties

 
California counties
San Joaquin Valley
1856 establishments in California
Populated places established in 1856
Majority-minority counties in California